Golden Gate University (GGU or Golden Gate) is a private university in San Francisco, California. Founded in 1901, GGU specializes in educating professionals through its schools of law, business, taxation, technology, accounting, psychology, and undergraduate studies. The university offers 8 undergraduate degrees and 17 graduate degree progams.

History

Golden Gate University evolved out of the literary reading groups of the San Francisco Central YMCA at a time when, according to one contemporary estimate, only one of every two thousand men had a college education. GGU shares its YMCA roots with a number of other U.S. universities, including Bentley University, Capital University Law School, Michigan State University College of Law, Northeastern University (Boston, Massachusetts), Northern Kentucky University Salmon P. Chase College of Law, Roosevelt University, South Texas College of Law, University of Toledo College of Law, Western New England University, and Youngstown State University. On November 1, 1881 at the YMCA building at 232 Sutter Street, which the organization had occupied since 1868, the YMCA Night School was established. Classes were offered in bookkeeping, mathematics, stenography, elocution, Spanish and gymnastics.  Successful completion of these courses led to a certificate that was recognized by more than 100 colleges and trade schools. Other offerings of the association would include a common school for boys. In April 1894 the YMCA moved to a new five-story building at the northeast corner of Mason and Ellis Streets.

The night school was renamed the Evening College on October 1, 1896, and became a full-fledged operation in 1901 with the creation of a law school. The law school was the first of the Y's educational departments to offer a full degree-level course, and thus the university traces its founding to the law school's establishment. Courses in Accountancy and Business Administration leading to the degree of Bachelor of Commercial Science began in 1908. Later, courses in foreign trade were added. The YMCA building was destroyed in the fire that followed the 1906 earthquake. Following the earthquake, the school was conducted out of tents, and later leased space at 1220 Geary St. (now Geary Boulevard near Franklin Street in the Western Addition). In November 1910 the school moved into the YMCA's new building (closed in 2009) at 220 Golden Gate Avenue at Leavenworth Street, in the Tenderloin neighborhood.

A student contest in 1927 resulted in the adoption of the new name Golden Gate, originally suggested by law student Charles H. Pool Jr. (1895–1977) (LLB 1925) because contest judges thought it symbolized "romantic California". The institution was separately incorporated from the Central YMCA on May 18, 1923, as Golden Gate College with the power to confer degrees as California law then provided. The college became fully independent of the YMCA in 1962; however, the "Y" contributed members to the school's Board of Trustees for some time thereafter.

The college continued to share the YMCA's building until June 1968, when it moved into the Allyne Building, a warehouse at 536 Mission Street originally built in 1924 as the showroom and wholesale department of Sherman Clay, a large retailer of pianos, records, record players, and other musical instruments. The college had purchased the building at auction in April 1964, and the Law School had occupied the first two floors since December 1964.

In 1972, the college expanded and elevated itself to university status. In 1979, a new "west wing" of the university was completed, where most of the classroom space is located today.

Academics
Golden Gate University is primarily a post-graduate institution focused on professional training in law and business, with its smaller undergraduate programs linked to its larger graduate and professional schools. Its six schools, with the year a university degree was first offered in the academic discipline, are:

School of Law (1901)
Edward S. Ageno School of Business (1908)
School of Accounting (1908)
Bruce F. Braden School of Taxation (1970)
School of Undergraduate Studies (2019)
GGU INSOFE Institute of Technology (2023)

Golden Gate University School of Law was founded in 1901. The School of Law offers the JD, Master of Legal Studies, LLM, and JSD (Doctor of Juridical Science) degrees.

The School of Undergraduate Studies offers the degrees of Associate of Arts, BA, and BS.

The Ageno School of Business offers the degrees of MA, MS, MBA, EMBA, EMPA (Executive Master of Public Admninistration), and DBA (Doctor of Business Administration).

Additionally, the degrees of Master of Arts in Counseling Psychology and Master of Arts in Industrial-Psychology are offered.

The Braden School of Taxation offers an Master of Taxation and the School of Accounting offers an MS in Accounting Data & Analytics (MSA).

The GGU INSOFE Institute of Technology will offer a Master of Science in Full Stack Artificial Intelligence and Machine Learning (ML) starting in the Summer of 2023.

Accreditation
Golden Gate University has been accredited by the Western Association of Schools and Colleges (WASC) or its successor organization the WASC Senior College and University Commission since 1959. It had previously been accredited by what is now the Northwest Commission on Colleges and Universities since 1950. Additionally, the School of Law has been accredited by the American Bar Association (ABA) since August 1956 and the Committee of Bar Examiners of the State Bar of California since 1940 (standards for accreditation having been adopted in 1937). The university's financial planning program is registered with the Certified Financial Planner Board of Standards and students completing either the master's in Financial Planning or the graduate certificate in financial planning qualify to sit for the Certified Financial Planner (CFP) certification exam.

Online programs
Golden Gate first offered distance education programs in 1993 via correspondence, online courses in 1997, then began offering fully accredited online degree programs in 1998. Online offerings include 13 graduate degrees, two undergraduate degrees, seven graduate certificates, and 10 undergraduate certificates, all of which can be completed entirely online. GGU's Online program is rated #89 in U.S. News & World Reports list of the Top Online Graduate Business Programs, while the online bachelor's program was ranked #63 out of 1,200 programs evaluated. GGU currently uses the Moodle online learning platform to manage and deliver course content.

Rankings
Washington Monthly Ranked GGU #1 on its list of Best Colleges for Adult Learners four years in a row (2016, 2017, 2018, 2019)
TaxTalent ranked Golden Gate University the highest-regarded MS Tax program in the United States along with DePaul University, which tied for first place. The results were based on the responses of 127 heads of corporate tax departments across the country.

Administration
At its incorporation as a separate institution from the YMCA in 1923, the college governance was divided between a four-member (increased to nine members in 1948) Board of Governors, which ran educational programs of the college including the conferral of degrees, and a five-member Board of Trustees to hold the college property. The appointments of the Director, Governors and trustees were made by the San Francisco YMCA. A 1948 reorganization raised the Director of Education to President, the incumbent Director, Nagel T. Miner (since 1931), becoming President. In September 1949 the Board of Governors and Board of Trustees were merged, with all current trustees retiring, and the members of the Board of Governors being elected onto the Board of Trustees, which had 14 members out of a possible maximum of 21 members.

Currently, the university is managed by a self-sustaining board of trustees of between 15 and 20 members. Trustees serve 3-year terms with one-third up for election annually. The president of the university and the president of the Alumni Association hold voting seats on the board. Additionally, there are four non-voting ex officio members, the President of the Student Government, the President of the Student Bar Association (law school student government); the President of the University Faculty Senate, and the Chair of the Law Faculty. The trustees are selected from the worlds of business, law, accounting, taxation, and philanthropy.  Since 2003 the majority of trustees have been alumni of the university. Of the current trustees all but three have at least one academic degree (excluding honorary degrees) from GGU.

The day-to-day operation of the university is in the hands of a president, provost, vice-presidents, and the deans of the schools (Accounting, Business, Law, Undergraduate Studies, Taxation, and Technology).

Presidents
Prior to 1948, the top executive was called the Educational Director.

Campuses

The GGU campus is located in the Financial District of San Francisco.  It maintains satellite teaching/learning sites in the following locations:

 The Silicon Valley learning site offers graduate programs in business and public administration.
 The Seattle learning site (opened in 1974) is the only one located outside of California.  It offers programs in taxation.

Students
Roughly 67 percent of students who attend Golden Gate University are in graduate business programs, 12 
percent are in undergraduate programs and 21 percent are law 
students. In 2019, more than 80% of the student population comes from South, and South-Central Asia.

Notable alumni and faculty

See also 

 List of colleges and universities in California
 List of business schools in the United States

References

External links

Official website

 
Universities and colleges in San Francisco
Educational institutions established in 1901
Schools accredited by the Western Association of Schools and Colleges
Financial District, San Francisco
South of Market, San Francisco
1901 establishments in California
Universities and colleges founded by the YMCA
Private universities and colleges in California